Wateringbury SSSI is a  geological Site of Special Scientific Interest in Wateringburym west of Maidstone in Kent. It is a Geological Conservation Review site.

This site contains tufa which displays a complete sequence of molluscs, especially terrestrial snails, dating to the early Holocene, and thus gives a full record of the order in which species colonised the area after the end of the last ice age, the Younger Dryas. 

The site is private land with no public access. It has been filled in and no geology is visible.

References

Sites of Special Scientific Interest in Kent
Geological Conservation Review sites